Angus Williams (born 11 November 1993) is a New Zealand rugby union player for Edinburgh Rugby in the United Rugby Championship. Williams' primary position is prop.

Rugby Union career

Professional career
Williams represented  in the 2018 Mitre 10 Cup. He was named in the Edinburgh squad for their Round 15 match of the 2020–21 Pro14 against .

External links
itsrugby Profile

References

1993 births
Living people
People from Whitianga
New Zealand rugby union players
Edinburgh Rugby players
Rugby union props
Otago rugby union players
Rugby union players from the Bay of Plenty Region
Rugby union players from Waikato
New Zealand expatriate rugby union players
Expatriate rugby union players in Scotland
New Zealand expatriate sportspeople in Scotland